Bridgeland Community is an  master-planned community under construction in unincorporated Harris County, Texas to the northwest of Houston between U.S. Highway 290 and Interstate 10. Bisecting Bridgeland is Segment E of the Grand Parkway, a 15.2-mile thoroughfare that broke ground in 2011 and opened in December 2013.

Planned for 20,000 homes and approximately 65,000 residents, Bridgeland is being developed by The Howard Hughes Corporation, which also develops The Woodlands, Columbia, and Summerlin. Bridgeland was named Community of the Year in 2009 by the National Association of Home Builders and was Developer of the Year in 2011 by the Texas Association of Builders.

History
Bridgeland is located along the eastern boundary of the Katy Prairie and traversed by a portion of the Cypress Creek riparian corridor. In the mid-1800s, European settlers began to establish small farms within the Katy Prairie, growing corn, potatoes and cotton and raising cattle. The land primarily became used for rice farming during the 1940s and through the next two decades. After rice production ceased, the fields were converted to improved pastures to provide foraging areas for cattle. Approximately 10,167 acres were purchased for development in 2003 and sales of new homes in Bridgeland began in 2006. An addition of 1,234 acres acquired in 2007 increased the development's total acreage to 11,401 acres.

Geography
Bridgeland consists of 11,401 acres of flat to gently rolling terrain in northwest Harris County. It is located on and along the eastern margins of the Katy Prairie. The property's northern boundary abuts the Cypress Creek Corridor. In addition to Cypress Creek, other existing natural and constructed features of note include Mallard Lake and Ramey Lake, Longenbaugh Pond, Langham Creek and the K-150 Canal. Developers follow a detailed conservation plan to protect the area's natural features, many of which are being incorporated into the community's amenity plan. The Bridgeland master plan details 3,000 acres of open and/or recreation space, including 900 acres of lakes.

Recreation
Bridgeland's master plan provides for abundant recreational choices for residents. Already open is the first of four planned recreation complexes — Lakeland Activity Center, which includes a freeform pool, junior Olympic-size pool, spray park, tower slides and diving platforms, as well as tennis courts, a playground and a 6,000-square-foot clubhouse that offers meeting rooms and a full fitness center.

More than 60 miles of trails are planned for the community, with many miles already open, including the first phase of Cypress Creek Nature Trail, a wooded trail in the Cypress Creek Corridor that has educational signage and wildlife observation areas.

Bridgeland residents can enjoy catch-and-release fishing and non-motorized boating on Lake Bridgeland and the 200-acre Cypress Lake. Residents have complimentary use of seasonally available canoes, kayaks, sailboats, fishing equipment and other recreational items.

Dozens of parks already exist in Bridgeland, with the master plan providing park space no more than a quarter mile from each homesite. The 30-acre Oak Meadow Park includes a 10-acre disc golf course and Festival Park offers a concert pavilion. Bridgeland's array of parks also includes themed parks, such as Butterfly Garden, Central Park, Maze Garden and a formal Rose Garden.

Bridgeland also has planned sites for churches within the community.

Special Events
Bridgeland hosts several large-scale events each year attended by residents and others from the surrounding area. Nature Fest began in 2008 and has been attended by more than 16,000 people since its inception. Each year, proceeds have benefited the Katy Prairie Conservancy and Habitat for Humanity Northwest Harris County, with the event raising approximately $18,000 for the two organizations through 2011. The event moved from a fall activity to the spring in 2011. The 2012 event takes place April 28.

The development debuted Howl-O-Ween Fest in 2009, an annual event for dogs, dog owners and other animal lovers. To date, more than 9,000 people have attended the Howl-O-Ween Fest, which has raised thousands for local pet rescue groups.

Nearly 3,000 athletes have competed in the annual Bridgeland Triathlon, a USA Triathlon-sanctioned race that began in 2009.

Education
Students in Bridgeland's first village, Lakeland Village; and those in Parkland Village, attend schools in the Cypress-Fairbanks Independent School District (CFISD).

Cypress-Fairbanks Independent School District
 residents are zoned to:
 Margie Sue Pope Elementary School, Jim and Sue Wells Elementary School, and Sue McGown Elementary School(separate sections)
 Smith Middle School
 Bridgeland High School

Pope Elementary School is in The Cove subdivision. In 2012 construction started on Elementary No. 53, located on a 14.5-acre parcel of land in Bridgeland. In November 2012 the CFISD board approved the final name of the school as Margie Sue Pope Elementary School; it was named after a longtime CFISD teacher. VLK Architects designed the school, which was built by Gamma Construction Co. Pope Elementary, with a cost of $14.6 million, was the first on-site school in Bridgeland. The Bridgeland organization donated  to CFISD so the school could be built; the school occupies , and the school building has  of space. It opened in August 2013, it is the first of nine on-site schools planned. Bridgeland's master plan also includes on-site preschools and childcare facilities.

Jim and Pam Wells Elementary School, another elementary school in Bridgeland, was scheduled to open in 2017. It was previously Elementary School #55, and is located on a  plot of land which will house other schools. Jim and Pam Wells were also longtime CFISD teachers and employees.

Histories of schools
In the beginning residents were zoned to Robison Elementary School, Spillane Middle School, and Cypress Woods High School.

Residents were at one point rezoned to Warner Elementary School, and Cypress Ranch High School. In 2017 the entire development was to be rezoned to Bridgeland High School.

Other school districts
Future phases of Bridgeland will be served by Katy Independent School District and the Waller Independent School District, though it is not guaranteed.

Villages

Bridgeland's master plan consists of four distinct villages: Lakeland Village, Creekland Village, Prairieland Village and Parkland Village. Each village will have clusters of neighborhoods anchored by a village center with amenities, retail, restaurants and more. Schools and parks also will be strategically located within each village.

Central to all villages will be Bridgeland Town Center, offering residents a convenient place to shop, work and have fun. The town center may include hospitals, schools, retail, entertainment, employment and more.

Lakeland Village

Lakeland Village consists of the following sections (neighborhoods):

The Shores:  The Shores is located approximately two miles west of Bridgeland's main entry on North Bridgeland Lake Parkway at Fry Road. It was the first community of new homes to be offered in Bridgeland and is slated for just under 600 homes. Surrounded by more than 100 acres of lakes, The Shores is located across the street from Oak Meadow Park and Cypress Creek Trail. House-Hahl Trail also runs through the neighborhood. Several playgrounds also are located within The Shores.
First Bend: First Bend is located off North Bridgeland Lake Parkway approximately 1.5 miles from Bridgeland's main entry. The community welcomed its first residents in May 2007. First Bend has 402 homesites in six separate neighborhoods and is surrounded by more than 60 acres of lakes. The community also is home to Turtle Lane and Butterfly Garden.
The Cove: The Cove is located just west of The Shores along North Bridgeland Lake Parkway. It is also home to a Cy-Fair ISD elementary school, planned to open in August 2013.  The Cove also features areas that are unique within Bridgeland's master plan, including an aromatic garden, an island park, a formal rose garden and a lakeside maze. A central park area offers one of several open play fields, a playground with equipment for toddlers and older children and a rain garden with butterfly houses. Bordering the park is an extension of the House-Hahl Trail, with several reforestation-planting beds to enhance the area's landscape. Bridgeland's model home park also is located in The Cove.
Water Haven: Water Haven is located just west of The Cove along North Bridgeland Lake Parkway. Development of the community started in 2010. Water Haven devotes approximately 22 acres to parks, most of which will offer playground equipment. The House-Hahl Trail also weaves through Water Haven.
Lakeland Heights: Lakeland Heights is located on Fry Road just south of Bridgeland's main entrance. It was introduced in 2010 as a Traditional Neighborhood Development. In designing Lakeland Heights, architectural firm Looney Ricks Kiss extensively researched traditional Houston neighborhoods, including West University Place, The Heights, Southampton and Southside Place, for architectural inspiration. The result is an unincorporated community that incorporates Craftsman, English Tudor, Classical and French housing styles to create neighborhoods that appear to have evolved over time. The community is planned for 350 homes and will also include Lakeland Heights Village Center, which will be home to retail, restaurants and services. Lakeland Heights is adjacent to Lakeland Activity Center and has several public spaces, including Central Park, Rabbit Run, Waterway Park and Festival Park, which offers a performance pavilion for community concerts and other productions.
Hidden Creek: Construction in Hidden Creek began in the summer of 2015. Hidden Creek is located west of Lakeland Heights and south of The Cove.  This new community will host 1,000 home sites, a 20-acre park, and 142 acres of lakes upon completion. Each neighborhood in Hidden Creek has been named after one of Texas’ noteworthy creek systems.  Additionally, the street names complement a variety of historical and geographical facets of the respective creeks.

Parkland Village
The Overall concept and theme of Parkland Village is based on the idea of living within a park. All neighborhoods have been named after Texas State Parks and the street names are representative of historical information, points of interest, flora and fauna found within these parks. The Grand Opening of the Model Home Park was held March 24, 2018. This section will ultimately consist of 3,100 homes with prices ranging from $240,000 to $1 million plus.

Parkland Village consists of the following sections (neighborhoods) - with more to be added as the development grows:

 Cedar Hill
 Cleburne
 Cooper Lake
 Enchanted Rock
 Honey Creek
 Kickapoo Cavern
 Longhorn Cavern
 Lost Maples
 McKinney Falls
 Meridian
 Mission Tejas
 Monument Hill
 Seminole Canyon
 Sheldon Lake

Places of worship:
Houston's First Baptist Church - Cypress Campus 
The Foundry Church - Fry Road Campus 
The Church of Jesus Christ of Latter-day Saints

Schools:
 Bridgeland High School
 CFISD Middle School #20 (Future) 
 Wells Elementary 
 Sue McGown Elementary School

References

Further reading
Bivins, Ralph. "New master-planned community to rival largest in Houston area." Houston Chronicle. Tuesday May 1, 2011. Business 1.
Jones, Allen. "Bridgeland builds on success." Houston Chronicle. Tuesday March 20, 2012.
Sarnoff, Nancy. "Developer yields to neighborhood opposition." Houston Chronicle. March 27, 2012.

External links

Bridgeland Homepage
 Official website for Bridgeland residents
Pope Elementary School

Unincorporated communities in Texas
Unincorporated communities in Harris County, Texas